The 1971 Northwestern Wildcats team represented Northwestern University during the 1971 Big Ten Conference football season. In their eighth year under head coach Alex Agase, the Wildcats compiled a 7–4 record (6–3 against Big Ten Conference opponents) and finished in second place in the Big Ten Conference.

The team's offensive leaders were quarterback Maurie Daigneau with 1,733 passing yards, Al Robinson with 881 rushing yards, and Barry Pearson with 674 receiving yards. Ten Northwestern players received honors on the 1971 All-Big Ten Conference football team.  They are: (1) Maurie Daigneau (AP-1; UPI-1); (2) running back Al Robinson (AP-2); (3) wide receiver Barry Pearson (AP-1; UPI-1); (4) offensive tackle Tom McCreight (AP-1); (5) defensive end Wil Hemby (UPI-2); (6) defensive tackle Jim Anderson (UPI-2); (7) linebacker John Voorhees (AP-2); and defensive ends (8) Eric Hutchinson (AP-1; UPI-1); (9) Jerry Brown (AP-2); and (10) Jack Duston (UPI-2). Eric Hutchinson was also selected as a first-team All-American by the Football Writers Association of America.

This was Northwestern's last winning season until the miraculous 1995 campaign when the Wildcats won a share of the Big Ten championship and played in the Rose Bowl.

Schedule

Roster

References

Northwestern
Northwestern Wildcats football seasons
Northwestern Wildcats football